Centre Township is one of thirteen townships in St. Joseph County, in the U.S. state of Indiana. As of the 2000 census, its population was 14,236.

Geography

Cities, towns, villages
 Gulivoire Park
 South Bend (partial)

Unincorporated towns
 Crest Manor Addition at 
 Gilmer Park at 
 Miami Trails Addition at 
 Nutwood at 
 Orchard Heights Addition at 
(This list is based on USGS data and may include former settlements.)

Adjacent townships
 Portage Township (north)
 Penn Township (east)
 Madison Township (southeast)
 Union Township (south)
 Greene Township (west)

Cemeteries
The township contains these four cemeteries: Mount Calvary, Southlawn, Southlawn and Van Buskirk.

Major highways

Landmarks
 Erskine Plaza
 Evergreen Hill was listed on the National Register of Historic Places in 2001.

School districts
 South Bend Community School Corporation

Political districts
 Indiana's 2nd congressional district
 State House District 6
 State House District 7
 State Senate District 9

References
 United States Census Bureau 2008 TIGER/Line Shapefiles
 United States Board on Geographic Names (GNIS)
 IndianaMap

External links
 Indiana Township Association
 United Township Association of Indiana

Townships in St. Joseph County, Indiana
South Bend – Mishawaka metropolitan area
Townships in Indiana